The Eastern Football Conference was an NCAA intercollegiate athletic football conference that existed from 1965 to 1974. The league's membership was centered in the Northeastern United States. A separate NCAA Division II conference with the same name existed from 1997 to 2000.

Members
The following is an incomplete list of the membership of the Met-Intercollegiate Conference.

Champions

1965 – Southern Connecticut State
1966 – Southern Connecticut State
1967 – Central Connecticut State & Southern Connecticut State
1968 – Southern Connecticut State
1969 – Bridgeport
1970 – Montclair State & Southern Connecticut State
1971 – Bridgeport
1972 – Central Connecticut State and Glassboro State
1973 – Central Connecticut State
1974 – Central Connecticut State

See also
List of defunct college football conferences

References

 
College sports in Connecticut
College sports in New Jersey